Leif-Erik Holm (born 1 August 1970) is a German politician of the AfD party and since 2017 member of the Bundestag, the German federal parliament.

Holm worked as a radio presenter for the private Antenne MV broadcaster, studied economics in Berlin, and became a politician in 2013.
Holm is since 2013, with a short interruption in 2015, state chairman of his party in Mecklenburg-Vorpommern.
He was the leading AfD candidate in the state in the 2013 German federal elections and was also frontrunner for his party in the 2016 Mecklenburg-Vorpommern state elections.
During the campaign Holm warned of the spread of Islam.

Holm temporarily worked for fellow AfD politician Beatrix von Storch.

References

1970 births
Living people
People from Nordwestmecklenburg
German radio presenters
Members of the Bundestag 2017–2021
Members of the Bundestag 2021–2025
Members of the Bundestag for the Alternative for Germany